Small penis humiliation (SPH) is a form of verbal erotic humiliation involving the penis where a dominant person usually consensually degrades a submissive's penis. The practice may involve sexual acts or just the verbal humiliation itself; it may take place in public or in private.

Submissive men who enjoy SPH do not necessarily have small penises. They like the idea of being humiliated and having the penis treated as useless, especially involving penis size-related offenses or mocking the penis in general. Some women get sexually aroused with the power to be the ultimate judge of a man's penis and to humiliate him. For many, weakening the sense of manhood imposed by society can be erotic.

SPH is often associated with cuckoldry when the submissive man is rejected and humiliated with the argument that he cannot satisfy his partner or his penis is not large enough to pleasure anyone. Some relate SPH to feminization as well, and even compare the submissive's penis size to the size of a clitoris during humiliation, although this way of degrading the penis is not well accepted by all dominant women because female genitalia should not be a way of insulting the penis.

Some small penis humiliations are also done online. The submissive man may post pictures of his penis on the internet for the purpose of being mocked. In many cases, there is a BDSM session via webcam, where a dominatrix humiliates the submissive through the video.

See also
Small penis rule

References 

BDSM terminology
Sexual acts
Human penis